Natchitoches Parish School Board (NPSB) is a school district headquartered in Natchitoches, Louisiana, United States. The current Superintendent is Dr. Grant Eloi.

Schools

PK-2 Schools
 L.P. Vaughn Elementary School (Natchitoches, Louisiana)

PK-5 Schools
 NSU Elementary Lab School (Natchitoches, Louisiana)

PK-8 Schools
 Fairview Elementary School (Campti, Louisiana)
 Goldonna Elementary/Jr. High School (Goldonna, Louisiana)
 Marthaville Elementary/Jr. High School (Marthaville, Louisiana)
 Natchitoches Magnet School (Natchitoches, Louisiana)
 Provencal Elementary/Jr. High School (Provencal, Louisiana)

3-4 Schools
 M.R. Weaver Elementary School (Natchitoches, Louisiana)

5-6 Schools
 East Natchitoches Elementary School (Natchitoches, Louisiana)

6-8 Schools
 NSU Middle Lab School (Natchitoches, Louisiana)

7-8 Schools
 Natchitoches Junior High-Frankie Ray Jackson School (Natchitoches, Louisiana)

7-12 Schools
 Lakeview Jr./Sr. High School (Campti, Louisiana)

High schools

 Lakeview Jr./Sr. High School (Campti, Louisiana)

 Natchitoches Central High School (Natchitoches, Louisiana)

 Natchitoches Parish Technical and Career Center (Natchitoches, Louisiana)

The former Ashland High School in the village of Ashland closed in 1981 as part of a school consolidation effort. High school pupils from that area attend Lakeview Jr./Sr. High School.

Online Programs
 Natchitoches Virtual Academy

References

External links

 Natchitoches Parish School Board
 Archives of old webpages

School districts in Louisiana
Education in Natchitoches Parish, Louisiana
School districts in Ark-La-Tex
School districts in the Central Louisiana